, provisionally designated: , is a large trans-Neptunian object orbiting in the scattered disc in the outermost regions of the Solar System. The object was discovered on 9 September 2010, by American astronomers David Rabinowitz, Megan Schwamb and Suzanne Tourtellotte at ESO's La Silla Observatory in northern Chile.

Orbit and classification 

 orbits the Sun at a distance of 37.5–61.9 AU once every 350 years and 4 months (127,948 days; semi-major axis of 49.7 AU). Its orbit has an eccentricity of 0.25 and an inclination of 31° with respect to the ecliptic. The body's observation arc begins with a precovery observation taken at Siding Spring Observatory in August 1976.

Due to its relatively high eccentricity and inclination, it is an object of the scattered disc rather than one of the regular Kuiper belt. Its perihelion of 37.5 AU is also too low to make it a detached object, which typically stay above 40 AU and never come close to the orbit of Neptune.

Numbering and naming 

This minor planet was numbered by the Minor Planet Center on 20 September 2021, receiving the number  in the minor planet catalog. , it has not been named.

Physical characteristics

Diameter and albedo 

The Collaborative Asteroid Lightcurve Link assumes an albedo of 0.10 and calculates a diameter of  based on an absolute magnitude of 4.1.

Rotation period 

As of 2020, no rotational lightcurve of this object has been obtained from photometric observations. The object's rotation period, pole and shape remain unknown.

References

External links 
 MPEC 2011-U09 : 2010 RF43, Minor Planet Electronic Circular, 17 October 2011
 
 

589683
589683
589683
589683
589683
20100906